Dianella White Eagles SC is an Australian soccer club based in Perth, Western Australia which was established by the local Serbian Australian community in 1978 as Dianella Serbia. The club will compete in 2023 in the Football West State League Division 1.

Situated in the heart of what the locals call Golden Triangle and a West Australian suburb named after a local blue lily (Dianella). Dianella White Eagles (DWE) is a Semi Professional football club established by the local Serbian/Australian community. 

DWE has a rich culture and heritage that brings together family, friends and community passion for the sport of soccer, better known as football. Our club is know for having some of the most passionate supporters that truly love the game of football. Our competitive spirit on field has yielded various success over the years. We take enormous pride and joy in seeing our juniors develop that majestic, playful, childlike love of the game, confidence, competitive spirit and a sense of community belonging. 

The newly elected DWE Committee is focused on bringing back the beautiful game of football to the community and reinstating DWE as a local powerhouse club that plays an entertaining style of football.

History
The team was formed under the name of Dianella Serbia in 1978, with the name changed to the current one in the 1990s per the FFA requirements at the time. The club has had some success winning the Division 1 title in 1993 sending them into the state's top division for a brief stint. The club has since spent its time in Division 1 coming close to winning the league in 2013 and 2017;

Club Colours, Crest and Song 
The club's crest shows a soccer ball with the double headed eagle (the national emblem of Serbia) on a badge with the Serbian national colours of red, blue and white in the background. Although the club is extremely welcoming of other cultures it is expected that the players and staff respect the Serbian Heritage of the club. The club's song is called "Igrale se Delije".

Rivalries 
Dianella White Eagles have a fierce rivalry with Western Knights, due to the ethnic heritage of the club, with Dianella's Serbian heritage and Western Knights' Croatian heritage.

Home ground 
Dianella's home ground is at Dianella Reserve, a public open space with many sporting facilities. Dianella share their ground with Little Athletics WA who use the ground during the summer months. The local Serbian community also have built their own stand-alone clubroom next to the existing clubrooms.

Coaching Staff and Squad List

Coaching staff 
The 2023 season coaching staff is as follows:

First Team Head Coach: Darran Quinncroft

First Team Coach: Steve Burton

First Team squad 

captain}}

Honours
1983 Third Division Runners-up

1990 Second Division Runners-up

1993 First Division Winners

2013 First Division Runners-up

2012, 2017 Karadjordje Kup Winners

2021 State League Div 2 winners

References

External links
 Official club website

Soccer clubs in Perth, Western Australia
Football West State League teams
Serbian sports clubs in Australia
Association football clubs established in 1978
1978 establishments in Australia